Susan Areno Yap-Sulit (born November 3, 1964) is a Filipina politician from the 2nd district of Tarlac, Philippines. She is currently serving as a Governor of Tarlac. She was first elected as Governor of the province in 2016 and was re-elected in 2019. Yap is the second child of former representative Jose “Aping” Yap Sr., who died of prostate cancer on March 1, 2010.

References

External links
Province of Tarlac

Living people
Governors of Tarlac
1965 births
University of the Philippines alumni
Nationalist People's Coalition politicians